A Birthday cake is a tradition in western culture.

It can also refer to:
"Birthday Cake" (song), by Rihanna
"Birthday Cake", a song by Parachute Express
"Birthday Cake" (Ivri Lider song)
Birthday cake interview, an Australian political interview
The Birthday Cake, a crime thriller film